Elihan Tore (Uyghur: ئەلىخان تۆرە; ; 21 March 1884 – 28 February 1976) was the 1st president of the Second East Turkestan Republic. He was born in Tokmok, formerly known as Balasagun, Kyrgyzstan and in 1920 he escaped from the Soviet Union to Kashgar in East Turkestan. In April 1944, Elihan Tore along with Abdulkerim Abbas, Xabib Yunich and nine others formed a liberation organization in Ghulja (Yining) to free East Turkestan of Chinese Nationalist rule. On 11 November 1944, they launched the Ili Rebellion with the support of the Soviet Union.

Biography
Elihan Tore was elected as President of the Eastern Turkestan Republic (ETR) next day after victory of Revolt in Ghulja city on 12 November 1944. He had a military rank of Marshal of Ili National Army, formed on 8 April 1945.

Elihan Tore was the only person in the ETR leadership who opposed Joseph Stalin's order to terminate offensive of Ili National Army on Urumchi and start negotiations with Kuomintang in October 1945.

On 16 June 1946, six days after signing in Urumchi of the "Peace Agreement" between representatives of Eastern Turkestan Republic and Kuomintang, that concluded the difficult eight months negotiations being started on 14 October 1945 under Soviets mediation with accordance of the offer of Generalissimo Chiang Kai-shek to peacefully resolve the Sinkiang crisis, he was forcibly brought back to the USSR by the KGB and confined here. The rest of his life he spent under house arrest in Tashkent, where he wrote a book Türkistan kaygısı (Turkistan Tragedy) about Xinjiang.

Works
 Türkistan kaygısı, Tashkent, Uzbekistan, East Publishing House, 2003
 Tarihiy Muhammadiy, Tashkent, Uzbekistan, Publisher:  Kutlukkhan Shakirov
 Drifter Saghuniy

External links
 Alikhan Tura and the Uyghur People.
 .
 Elihan Tore in issue 1 of the Islamic Turkistan.

References

Chinese Muslims
East Turkestan independence activists
1884 births
1976 deaths
Uyghur activists
Uzbeks